Bill Burgess (1872–1950) was the second person to successfully complete a swim of the English Channel.

Bill Burgess may also refer to:

 Bill Burgess (American football) (born 1941), American football player and coach
 Bill Burgess (rugby, born 1939), English rugby union and rugby league footballer 
 Bill Burgess (rugby league, born 1897) (1897–?), English rugby league footballer

See also
 William Burgess (disambiguation)